The 1975–76 San Diego Mariners season was the second season of operation of the San Diego Mariners in the World Hockey Association (WHA). The Mariners placed third in the Western Division to qualify for the playoffs, losing in the second round to the Houston Aeros.

Offseason

Regular season

Final standings

Game log

Playoffs

San Diego Mariners 3, Phoenix Roadrunners 2 - Preliminary Round

Houston Aeros 4, San Diego Mariners 2 - Quarterfinals

Player stats

Note: Pos = Position; GP = Games played; G = Goals; A = Assists; Pts = Points; +/- = plus/minus; PIM = Penalty minutes; PPG = Power-play goals; SHG = Short-handed goals; GWG = Game-winning goals
      MIN = Minutes played; W = Wins; L = Losses; T = Ties; GA = Goals-against; GAA = Goals-against average; SO = Shutouts;

Awards and records

Transactions

Draft picks
San Diego's draft picks at the 1975 WHA Amateur Draft.

Farm teams

See also
1975–76 WHA season

References

External links

San
San
San Diego Mariners seasons